Acanthocyclus is a genus of crabs belonging to the family Belliidae.

The species of this genus are found in Southern America.

Species:

Acanthocyclus albatrossis 
Acanthocyclus gayi 
Acanthocyclus hassleri

References

Crabs
Decapod genera